Flubergbakken (also Odnesbakken) was a HS117 ski jumping hill located between Fluberg and Odnes in Norway, opened in 1926. It was part of Odnes Ski Senter and owned by Fluberg IL Ski Club.

Hill was renovated in 1955, 1985, 2002, then demolished in 2008. They hosted nine Norwegian National Championships in 1969, 1972, 1977, 1981, 1987, 1989, 1990, 1993 and 2002.

History
On 21 February 1926, Norweg Erling Andersen fell at  world record distance.

On 18 February 1931, four invalid and two official world records were set on this hill that day, all by Norwegian ski jumpers.

Ski jumping world records

Men 

 Not recognized! Fall at world record distance.

Ladies

Competitions

Flubergrennet 
1976 race was organized on another hill.

National Championships

References

External links
Flubergbakken (Odnesbakken) at skisprungschanzen.com

Ski jumping venues in Norway